A military budget (or military expenditure), also known as a defense budget, is the amount of financial resources dedicated by a state to raising and maintaining an armed forces or other methods essential for defense purposes.

Financing militaries

Military budgets often reflect how strongly a country perceives the likelihood of threats against it, or the amount of aggression it wishes to conjure. It also gives an idea of how much financing should be provided for the upcoming fiscal year. The size of a budget also reflects the country's ability to fund military activities. Factors include the size of that country's economy, other financial demands on that entity, and the willingness of that entity's government or people to fund such military activity. Generally excluded from military expenditures is spending on internal law enforcement and disabled veteran rehabilitation. The effects of military expenditure on a nation's economy and society, and what determines military expenditure, are notable issues in political science and economics. There are controversial findings and theories regarding these topics. Generally, some suggest military expenditure is a boost to local economies.  Still, others maintain military expenditure is a drag on development.

Among the countries maintaining some of the world's largest military budgets, China, India, France, Germany, Japan, Russia, the United Kingdom and the United States are frequently recognized to be great powers.

According to the Stockholm International Peace Research Institute, in 2018, total world military expenditure amounted to 1.822 trillion US$.

In 2018, the United States spent 3.2% of its GDP on its military, while China 1.9%, Russia 3.9%, France 2.3%, United Kingdom 1.8%, India 2.4%, Israel 4.3%, South Korea 2.6% and Germany spent 1.2% of its GDP on defense.

Historic expenditure

The Saturday Review magazine in February 1898 outlined the levels of military expenditure as a percentage of tax revenue spent by the then great powers for the year 1897:
 United States: 17%. The United States has fluctuated for decades, depending on the conflict of the time. The first spike in defense spending, and in turn taxes, came during the very beginning of the 19th century. During World War I, the United States spent 22% of gross domestic product, while during peacetime, the government spent on as little as 1% Gross Domestic Product (GDP). This changed following World War II as the United States government were experiencing an immense fear of the expansion of communism and therefore heightened security on all fronts. This was supported by Americans as it brought upon them a sense of security and the 3.6% GDP they were contributing to was a large decrease from the whopping amounts of capital being spent during WWII that exceeded 41%, before decreasing to 10% during the Cold War and for about two more decades after, including the Vietnam War, before beginning to decrease in the 1970s down to 6%, then 5.5% in 1979 before beginning to steadily incline once again. After 2001, though, and the September 11 terrorist attacks, defense spending spiked again, peaking at 5.7% in 2010. 
 Russian Empire: 21%
 French Third Republic: 27%
 British Empire: 39%
 German Empire: 43%
 Empire of Japan: 55%

See also

 List of countries by military expenditures
 Past military expenditure by country
 List of countries by military expenditure per capita
 Arms industry
 History of military technology
 Military–industrial complex
 List of countries by Global Militarization Index

References

External links

Government budgets
Budget